Sompong Phungphook (born 29 October 1970) is a Thailand national beach soccer team player.

He competed for Thailand at the 2000 and 2004 FIFA Futsal World Cup finals.

References

Sompong Phungphook
Sompong Phungphook
Living people
1970 births